Arihant (Hindi: अरिहंत , Jain Prakrit: अरिहन्त , Pali: अर्हत् , Arihanta) may refer to:

 Arihant (Jainism), in Jainism, a siddha who has not yet died
 Arihant-class submarine, a class of submarines being developed for the Indian Navy
 INS Arihant, the lead ship of India's Arihant class of nuclear-powered submarines
 Arhat, in Buddhism, a person who has attained nirvana, the perfected one

See also